The South African Railways Class  of 1980 is a diesel-electric locomotive.

In 1980 and 1981, the South African Railways placed thirty  General Electric type U26C diesel-electric locomotives in service.

Manufacturer
The Class  type GE U26C diesel-electric locomotive was designed by General Electric and built for the South African Railways (SAR) by the South African General Electric-Dorman Long Locomotive Group (SA GE-DL, later Dorbyl).

Distinguishing features

The ex Iscor Class  loco­motives could be visually dis­ting­uished from the other series by the air conditioning units mounted on the cab roofs of most of them and initially, when it was still a feature unique to them, by their running board-mounted handrails.

At some stage during the mid-1980s, all Class ,  and  locomotives had saddle filters installed across the long hood, mounted just to the rear of the screens on the sides behind the cab. Since then, Class  locomotives could be distinguished from the older models by the absence of the saddle filter.

Modifications

Fuel capacity
As built, the Class  had a  fuel tank and interlinked bogies, while the Class  was delivered new to Iscor with a  fuel tank to cope with the lack of en route refueling points on the Sishen-Saldanha iron ore line. To accommodate the larger fuel tank, the inter-bogie linkage found on all other models was omitted on the Class .

To be usable on the iron ore line, Class  locomotives which ended up working there were modified to a similar fuel capacity. The inter-bogie linkage was removed and the fuel tank was enlarged by changing it from saddle-shaped to rectangular box-shaped. To maintain its lateral balance, a slab of metal was attached to each bogie in place of the removed linkage. In the second picture, the weld lines on the end of the enlarged fuel tank as well as the metal slab at the end of the bogie are visible.

Running board-mounted handrails
Class  locomotives which are allocated to the Sishen-Saldanha Orex line are usually further modified by having removable running board-mounted handrails installed. All South African diesel-electric locomotives have their side handrails mounted along the upper edges of their long hoods. The ex Iscor Class , however, came equipped with additional removable running board-mounted handrails. Since these handrails are slide-fit into brackets welded onto the running board, they are easily removed.

Electronic control system
Beginning in 2010, some locomotives were equipped with electronic fuel injection and GE Bright Star control systems. On some of the first locomotives which were so modified, externally visible evidence of the modification is a raised middle portion of the long hood. All Bright Star-equipped locomotives emerged from this modification repainted in the Transnet Freight Rail livery.

Service

Class  locomotives work on most mainlines and some branchlines in the central, western, southern and southeastern parts of the country. Some eventually joined the Class  on the  Sishen-Saldanha iron ore line to haul export ore from the open cast iron mines at Sishen in the Northern Cape to the harbour at Saldanha in the Western Cape.

On the Sishen–Saldanha Orex line, GE Class 34 series diesel-electric locomotives run consisted to Class 9E and Class 15E electric locomotives to haul the 342-truck iron ore trains. In South Africa, mixed electric and diesel-electric consists are unique to the iron ore line.

Works numbers
The Class  builder's works numbers are listed in the table.

Liveries
All but seven Class 34-900 locomotives were delivered in the SAR Gulf Red livery with signal red buffer beams, yellow side stripes on the long hood sides and a yellow V on each end. In the 1990s many of the Class 34-900 units began to be repainted in the Spoornet orange livery with a yellow and blue chevron pattern on the buffer beams. In the late 1990s many were repainted in the Spoornet blue livery with outline numbers on the long hood sides. After 2008 in the Transnet Freight Rail (TFR) era, many were repainted in the TFR red, green and yellow livery.

Illustration

References

3410
C-C locomotives
Co′Co′ locomotives
Co+Co locomotives
General Electric locomotives
Dorbyl locomotives
Cape gauge railway locomotives
Railway locomotives introduced in 1980
1980 in South Africa